Tamarix gennessarensis is a species of flowering plant in the tamarisk family Tamaricaceae, native to the Anti-Lebanon Mountains of Lebanon and Syria, and to northeastern Israel. It is a shrub of riparian habitats.

References

gennessarensis
Flora of Lebanon
Flora of Syria
Flora of Israel
Plants described in 1956